NGC 1934 (also known as ESO 56-SC109) is an emission nebula located in the Dorado constellation and part of the Large Magellanic Cloud. It was discovered by John Herschel on November 23 1834. Its apparent magnitude is 10.50.

References

emission nebulae
ESO objects
1934
Dorado (constellation)
Large Magellanic Cloud
Astronomical objects discovered in 1834